Dhimitër is the Albanian variant of the Greek name Demetrios. It may refer to:

Dhimitër Progoni (fl. 1208–1216), Albanian ruler
Dhimitër Jonima (fl. 1409), Albanian nobleman
Dhimitër Frëngu (1443–1525), Albanian scholar, soldier and Catholic priest
Dhimitër Berati (1886–1970), Albanian politician and journalist
Dhimitër Pasko (1907–1967), Albanian writer
Dhimitër Xhuvani (1934–2009), Albanian writer and screenwriter
Dhimitër Anagnosti (b. 1936), Albanian film director
Dhimitër Orgocka (1936–2021), Albanian film director and theatre actor and director
Dhimitër Zografi (1878–1945), one of the Albanian Independence Declaration signatories
Dhimitër Mborja (fl. 1878), one of the Albanian Independence Declaration signatories
Dhimitër Ilo (fl. 1878), one of the Albanian Independence Declaration signatories
Dhimitër Shuteriqi (1915–2003), Albanian writer, historian and critic
Dhimitër Kacimbra, Albanian politician
Dhimitër Kamarda, Arbëreshë (Italo-Albanian) linguist

Albanian masculine given names